Kurtović or Kurtovic is a surname found in Croatia and Bosnia and Herzegovina.  People with the name include:

Amanda Kurtović (born 1991), Norwegian handball player of Croatian descent
Elvis J. Kurtović (born 1962), Bosnian rock and roll musician
Esad Kurtović (born 1965), Bosnian medievalist
Hrvoje Kurtović (born 1983), Croatian footballer
Ivan Kurtović (born 1968), retired Croatian footballer
Jovo Kurtović (1718–1809), Serbian merchant
Mirza Kurtović (born 1977), former Macedonian basketball player
William Kurtović (born 1996), Swedish footballer

References

Croatian surnames
Serbian surnames
Bosnian surnames